The Essential Billie Holiday: Carnegie Hall Concert Recorded Live is a live album by jazz singer Billie Holiday that was recorded on November 10, 1956 at Carnegie Hall in New York City. The two concerts promoted Billie Holiday's autobiography, Lady Sings the Blues.

Content
Between songs, Gilbert Millstein of The New York Times read aloud four lengthy passages from her autobiography, Lady Sings the Blues. The narrated parts of the concerts were not included until the re-release on CD in 1989.

The autobiography was ghostwritten. Norman Granz, her manager, suspected she had never read it.

In the liner notes of the album Millstein wrote:

The critic Nat Hentoff of Down Beat magazine, who attended the Carnegie Hall concert, wrote the remainder of the sleeve notes on the 1961 album. He wrote of Holiday's performance:

Track listing
LP (Verve)
Side A
"Lady Sings the Blues" (Holiday, Herbie Nichols) – 2:38
"Ain't Nobody's Business If I Do" (Porter Grainger, Everett Robbins) – 2:30
"Please Don't Talk About Me When I'm Gone" (Sam H. Stept, Sidney Clare, Bee Palmer) – 1:43
"I'll Be Seeing You" (Sammy Fain, Irving Kahal) – 2:18
"I Love My Man" (Holiday) – 3:18
"Body and Soul" (Edward Heyman, Robert Sour, Frank Eyton, Johnny Green) – 2:40

Side B
"Don't Explain" (Holiday, Arthur Herzog Jr.) – 2:26
"Yesterdays" (Jerome Kern, Otto Harbach) – 1:01
"My Man" (Jacques Charles, Channing Pollock, Albert Willemetz, Maurice Yvain) – 3:13
"I Cried for You" (Gus Arnheim, Arthur Freed, Abe Lyman) – 3:09
"Fine and Mellow" (Holiday) – 3:15
"I Cover the Waterfront" (Green, Heyman) – 3:46
"What a Little Moonlight Can Do" (Harry M. Woods) – 2:43

CD (Verve, 1989)
"Reading from Lady Sings the Blues" – 2:52
"Lady Sings the Blues" (Holiday, Nichols) – 2:38
"Ain't Nobody's Business If I Do" (Grainger, Robbins) – 2:33
"Reading from Lady Sings the Blues/Trav'lin' Light" (Trummy Young, Jimmy Mundy, Johnny Mercer) – 0:44
"Reading from Lady Sings the Blues" – 2:06
"Billie's Blues" (Holiday) – 3:20
"Body and Soul" (Heyman, Sour, Eyton, Green) – 2:41
"Reading from Lady Sings the Blues" – 0:55
"Don't Explain" (Holiday, Herzog) – 2:30
"Yesterdays" (Kern, Harbach) – 1:16
"Please Don't Talk About Me When I'm Gone" (Stept, Clare, Palmer) – 1:43
"I'll Be Seeing You" (Fain, Kahal) – 2:28
"Reading from Lady Sings the Blues" – 2:50
"My Man" (Charles, Pollock, Willemetz, Yvain) – 3:13
"I Cried for You" (Arnheim, Freed, Lyman) – 3:09
"Fine and Mellow" (Holiday) – 3:15
"I Cover the Waterfront" (Green, Heyman) – 3:46
"What a Little Moonlight Can Do" (Woods) – 2:49

Personnel
Billie Holiday with the Chico Hamilton Quintet
Billie Holiday, vocals
Carl Drinkard, piano
Kenny Burrell, guitar
Carson Smith, bass
Chico Hamilton, drums
Narration by Gilbert Millstein
on tracks 1–9 (CD) with
Roy Eldridge, trumpet
Coleman Hawkins, tenor sax
Tony Scott, piano
on tracks 10–18 with
Buck Clayton, trumpet
Al Cohn, tenor sax
Tony Scott, clarinet

Notes

Billie Holiday albums
1956 live albums
1961 live albums
Albums recorded at Carnegie Hall
Live jazz albums
Verve Records live albums
Albums produced by Norman Granz